Going Some is a lost 1920 silent film directed by Harry Beaumont. It stars Cullen Landis, Helen Ferguson, Kenneth Harlan and Lillian Hall. It was released by Goldwyn Pictures.

Cast
Cullen Landis - J. Wallingford Speed
Helen Ferguson - Jean Chapin
Lillian Hall - Helen Blake
Lillian Langdon - Miz Gallagher
Kenneth Harlan - Donald Keap
Ethel Grey Terry - Mrs. Roberta Keap
Willard Louis - Larry Glass
Walter Hiers - Berkeley Fresno
Frank Braidwood - Culver Covington
Nelson McDowell - Still Bill Stover
Snitz Edwards - Willie
Hayward Mack - Laden
Maurice Flynn - Skinner

References

External links
 Going Some at IMDb.com

1920 films
American silent feature films
Lost American films
Silent American comedy films
1920 comedy films
American black-and-white films
Films directed by Harry Beaumont
1920 lost films
Lost comedy films
1920s American films